Mogherini is an Italian surname. Notable people with the surname include:

Federica Mogherini (born 1973), Italian politician
Flavio Mogherini (1922–1994), Italian production designer, art director, and film director

See also
Magherini

Italian-language surnames